The Wing Loong-10 (Literal meaning: Winged Dragon, military designation WZ-10) is a series of unmanned aerial vehicles of the High-Altitude Long Endurance (HALE) type, featuring some stealth characteristics.  it is being developed by the Chengdu Aircraft Industry Group for reconnaissance and precision strike missions.

Previously known as the Wind Shadow and Cloud Shadow prototypes, the drone platform features various configurations and is designed for both the Chinese military and export customers.

History
In 2007, Chengdu Aircraft Industry Group showcased Sky Wing III high-speed, high-altitude, tactical unmanned aerial vehicle at the 47th Paris International Aerospace Exhibition. The drone is externally similar to General Atomics Avenger, which was under development at the time. According to the manufacturer, The drone has a 15 km ceiling and 750 km/h speed, and the endurance is 6 hours. In 2014, the Sky Wing III was renamed to Wind Shadow with a twin-engine, longer endurance design featuring stealth characteristics.

An export-orientated version called Cloud Shadow was unveiled at the Zhuhai Air Show in 2016. The primary difference between Wind Shadow and Cloud Shadow is the engine. Wind Shadow features a twin-engine, stealth nozzle, and is turbofan powered. However, Cloud Shadow features a single turbojet engine without any stealth concealment for the nozzle.

In 2018, China Meteorological Administration launched the Haiyan Project, a meteorological observation experiment. Wind Shadow is used by the China Meteorological Administration to monitor typhoon movements. Military observers noted that Wind Shadow is also called Wing Loong-10, an unmanned aerial vehicle (UAV) product line manufactured by Chengdu Aircraft Industry Group, though Wing Loong series previously only had turboprop UAVs.

Design

Characteristics
According to GlobalSecurity.org, the Wind Shadow variant with two engines is designed for PLA domestic service, while the Cloud Shadow is export-oriented.

The Wind Shadow, designed and constructed by Chengdu Aircraft Corporation for service with the People's Liberation Army Air Force, debuted at the 2014 Zhuhai Air Show. The UAV's wings, fuselage, and tail sections are built using composite materials. The bulbous nose assembly is well-streamlined and tapers to the rear to which an air scoop is set over the dorsal line. The scoop is straddled by outward-canted vertical fins. The radar cross section is designed to be reduced.

The UAV is offered in two variants, combat and ISR variant, which stands for intelligence, surveillance, and reconnaissance. The combat version comes with a range of weaponry to attack ground-based targets, on the other hand, the ISR variant is provided with payloads to assist armed forces in missions such as reconnaissance, battlefield assessment, observation, and monitoring.

Each Wind Shadow unmanned aircraft system includes three unmanned aerial vehicles, linked with one ground control station, and strike payloads. Cloud shadow UAV ground station by configuration can control three unmanned aerial vehicles to engage simultaneously, the usage of drones can be flexibly configured according to user needs. In the manual mode of operation, the operator sends mission commands to the aircraft via the data link. The drone is capable of flying autonomously.

The UAV has six hardpoints, three on each wing, to mount weapons. With a take-off weight of 3,200kg and a payload capacity of 400 kg, the drone can be equipped with a 50 kg CS/BBM3 (YL-12) GPS-guided bomb, Blue Arrow air-to-surface missile, 100 kg GB-4 precision-guided bomb, and light cruise missiles.

Engines
Cloud shadow is powered by a single WP-11C turbojet engine, or a single 1-ton class ZF850 engine, or optionally two AFE-50E turbofan engines.

Wind shadow features two WS-500 turbofan engines, and the engine nozzles are concealed inside the vehicle body with stealth features. In addition, a deceleration parachute is mounted in between the engine nozzles.

Variants
Sky Wing III An early prototype of Wing Loong-10. High-speed, high-altitude, tactical unmanned aerial vehicle. Unveiled at the 47th Paris International Aerospace Exhibition in 2007.
Wind Shadow A Chinese domestic military version prototype designation for Wing Loong-10. Featured stealth design, twin-engine, turbofan-powered, high-speed, high-altitude, long-endurance unmanned aerial vehicle. Unveiled in 2014.
Cloud Shadow An export version prototype designation for Wing Loong-10. Stealth features, single-engine (optional twin-engine), turbojet powered, high-speed, high-altitude, medium endurance unmanned aerial vehicle. Unveiled in 2016.
Wing Loong-10 Mass-produced variant for export, first debuted on August 2, 2020, for a typhoon detection test flight.
Wing Loong-10A Export variant unveiled at Zhuhai Airshow 2022.
Wing Loong-10B Export variant unveiled at Zhuhai Airshow 2022.
WZ-10 Chinese military designation. Reconnaissance electronic warfare platform. Unveiled at Zhuhai Airshow 2022.

Operators

People's Liberation Army Air Force: WZ-10: 12 as of 2018
China Meteorological Administration: Wing Loong-10

Specifications (Cloud Shadow)

See also

References

Stealth aircraft
Unmanned military aircraft of China
Cloud Shadow
Single-engined jet aircraft
Proposed aircraft of China